Maud Joachim (1869 – 1947) was born in 1869 and was educated at Girton College .She was one of the groups of suffragettes that fought to grant women the right to vote in the U.K., she was jailed several times for her protests.

Activism

She was militant and a member of the hard line Women's Social and Political Union which was led by Emmeline Pankhurst. She enjoyed the camaraderie and reflected that she was now with people with the same purpose.

Imprisonments

 In February 1908 Joachim when groups of suffragettes were delivered to the front door of the House of Commons transported in pantechnicon vans, this event was called the "Pantechnicon Raid", the group was arrested, and she was sentenced to six weeks imprisonment.
 In June she was arrested again after an attempt to visit the Prime Minister, along with Mrs Pankhurst, Emmeline Pethick- Lawrence, Jessie Stephenson and Florence Haig. Maud Joachim was thwarted and a crowd rushed the police. Joachim was sentenced to three months in Holloway Prison.
 In 1909 she was in Scotland working in Aberdeen. That November she joined a protest that disturbed a talk by Winston Churchill at his constituency in Dundee. She was arrested along with Helen Archdale, Catherine Corbett and Adela Pankhurst and sentenced to ten days in prison. During her sentence she went on hunger strike and became the first woman in Scotland to take this form of protest.

In an imaginative protest organised with Katherine Douglas Smith Joachim held up traffic in the West End by the two riding black bay horses up the Strand, at the same time advertising a suffragette meeting at the Royal Albert Hall.

Residency at Eagle House
Joachim was invited to Eagle House in 1910. A plaque was made and her photograph was recorded by Colonel Linley Blathwayt.

Eagle House near Bath in Somerset had become an important refuge for suffragettes who had been released from prison after hunger strikes. Mary Blathwayt's parents planted trees there between April 1909 and July 1911 to commemorate the achievements of suffragettes including Emmeline Pankhurst, Christabel Pankhurst, Annie Kenney, Charlotte Despard, Millicent Fawcett and Lady Lytton.
The trees were known as "Annie's Arboreatum" after Annie Kenney. There was also a "Pankhurst Pond" within the grounds.

Personal life

Joachim was a vegetarian. She was given a Hunger Strike Medal 'for Valour' by WSPU.

Death

Maud Joachim died in Steyning in 1947. On her death Joachim left Katherine Douglas Smith a legacy in her will.

See also

 Eagle House (suffragette's rest)
 Hunger Strike Medal

References

1869 births
1947 deaths
Eagle House suffragettes
Hunger Strike Medal recipients
Women's Social and Political Union